Hans-Jakob Schädler (born 30 October 1945) is a Liechtenstein judoka. He competed at the 1972 Summer Olympics and the 1976 Summer Olympics.

References

1945 births
Living people
Liechtenstein male judoka
Olympic judoka of Liechtenstein
Judoka at the 1972 Summer Olympics
Judoka at the 1976 Summer Olympics
Place of birth missing (living people)